= Pushkin Is Our Everything =

- Directed by: Michael Beckelhimer
- Written by: Michael Beckelhimer
- Produced by: Michael Beckelhimer
- Edited by: Michael Closson
- Music by: Vladimir Podgoretsky
- Distributed by: Michael Beckelhimer Productions
- Release date: June 6, 2014
- Running time: 71 minutes
- Country: United States
- Languages: English, Russian

Pushkin Is Our Everything (Russian: «Пушкин — наше всё», romanized: Pushkin — nashye vsyo) is a 2014 American documentary film directed, written, and produced by Michael Beckelhimer. The film is about life and times of the 19th-century Russian poet Aleksandr Pushkin and his lasting influence and legacy on 200 years of Russian history. The name of the film is a set expression in Russian.
